{{Infobox planet
| name               = Dione
| mpc_name           = Saturn IV
| pronounced         = 
| named_after        = Διώνη Diōnē
| adjectives         = Dionean 
| image              = Dione in natural light (cropped).jpg
| caption            = Dione photographed in natural light by theCassini spacecraft in 2008

| discoverer         = Giovanni Cassini
| discovered         = March 30, 1684
| semimajor          =  
| eccentricity       = 
| period             = 
| inclination        = 0.019° (to Saturn's equator)
| satellite_of       = Saturn
| dimensions         = 1128.8 × 1122.6 × 1119.2 km
| surface_area       = 
| mean_diameter        = 
| mean_radius        = 
| mass               =  (1.834 Earths)
| density            = 
| surface_grav       =  m/s2
| escape_velocity    =  km/s
| rotation           =   (synchronous)
| axial_tilt         = zero
| albedo             =  (geometric)
| magnitude          = 10.4 
| single_temperature = 87 K (−186°C)
}}
Dione is a moon of Saturn. It was discovered by Italian astronomer Giovanni Domenico Cassini in 1684. It is named after the Titaness Dione of Greek mythology. It is also designated Saturn IV.

 Name 
Giovanni Domenico Cassini named the four moons he discovered (Tethys, Dione, Rhea and Iapetus) Sidera Lodoicea ("the stars of Louis") to honor king Louis XIV. Cassini found Dione in 1684 using a large aerial telescope he set up on the grounds of the Paris Observatory. The satellites of Saturn were not named until 1847, when William Herschel's son John Herschel published Results of Astronomical Observations made at the Cape of Good Hope, suggesting that the names of the Titans (sisters and brothers of Cronus) be used.

 Orbit 
Dione orbits Saturn with a semimajor axis about 2% less than that of the Moon. However, reflecting Saturn's greater mass (95 times that of Earth), Dione's orbital period is one tenth that of the Moon. Dione is currently in a 1:2 mean-motion orbital resonance with moon Enceladus, completing one orbit of Saturn for every two orbits completed by Enceladus. This resonance maintains Enceladus's orbital eccentricity (0.0047), providing a source of heat for Enceladus's extensive geological activity, which shows up most dramatically in its cryovolcanic geyser-like jets. The resonance also maintains a smaller eccentricity in Dione's orbit (0.0022), tidally heating it as well.

Dione has two co-orbital, or trojan, moons, Helene and Polydeuces. A leading co-orbital moon twelve degrees ahead of Helene was reported by Stephen P. Synnott in 1982.Guinness Book of Astronomy, Patrick Moore,
Guinness Publishing, second edition, 1983 pp 110, 114

 Physical characteristics and interior 

At  in diameter, Dione is the 15th largest moon in the Solar System, and is more massive than all known moons smaller than itself combined. It is also Saturn's fourth-largest moon. Based on its density, Dione’s interior is likely a combination of silicate rock and water ice in nearly equal parts by mass.

Shape and gravity observations collected by Cassini suggest a roughly 400 km radius rocky core surrounded by a roughly 160 km envelope of H2O, mainly in the form of water ice, but with some models suggesting that the lowermost part of this layer could be in the form of an internal liquid salt water ocean (a situation similar to that of its orbital resonance partner, Enceladus). Downward bending of the surface associated with the 1.5 km high ridge Janiculum Dorsa can most easily be explained by the presence of such an ocean.Overlooked Ocean Worlds Fill the Outer Solar System.  John Wenz, Scientific American. 4 October 2017.  Neither moon has a shape close to hydrostatic equilibrium; the deviations are maintained by isostasy. Dione's ice shell is thought to vary in thickness by less than 5%, with the thinnest areas at the poles, where tidal heating of the crust is greatest.

Though somewhat smaller and denser, Dione is otherwise very similar to Rhea. They both have similar albedo features and varied terrain, and both have dissimilar leading and trailing hemispheres. Dione's leading hemisphere is heavily cratered and is uniformly bright. Its trailing hemisphere, however, contains an unusual and distinctive surface feature: a network of bright ice cliffs.

Scientists recognise Dionean geological features of the following types:
 Chasmata (chasms; long, deep, steep-sided depressions or canyons)
 Dorsa (ridges)
 Fossae (long narrow depressions)
 Craters
 Catenae (crater chains)

 Ice cliffs (formerly 'wispy terrain') 

When the Voyager space probe photographed Dione in 1980, it showed what appeared to be wispy features covering its trailing hemisphere. The origin of these features was mysterious, because all that was known was that the material has a high albedo and is thin enough that it does not obscure the surface features underneath. One hypothesis was that shortly after its formation Dione was geologically active, and some process such as cryovolcanism resurfaced much of its surface, with the streaks forming from eruptions along cracks in the Dionean surface that fell back as snow or ash. Later, after the internal activity and resurfacing ceased, cratering continued primarily on the leading hemisphere and wiped out the streak patterns there.

This hypothesis was proven wrong by the Cassini probe flyby of December 13, 2004, which produced close-up images. These revealed that the 'wisps' were, in fact, not ice deposits at all, but rather bright ice cliffs created by tectonic fractures (chasmata). Dione has been revealed as a world riven by enormous fractures on its trailing hemisphere.

 Linear features 
Dione features linear 'virgae' that are up to hundreds of km long but less than 5 km wide. These lines run parallel to the equator and are only apparent at lower latitudes (at less than 45° north or south); similar features are noted on Rhea. They are brighter than everything around them and appear to overlay other features such as ridges and craters, indicating they are relatively young. It has been proposed that these lines are of exogenic origin, as the result of the emplacement of material across the surface by low‐velocity impacts of material sourced from Saturn's rings, co‐orbital moons, or closely approaching comets.

 Craters 

Dione's icy surface includes heavily cratered terrain, moderately cratered plains, lightly cratered plains, and areas of tectonic fractures. Some of the plains are more heavily cratered than others. Much of the heavily cratered terrain is located on the trailing hemisphere, with the less cratered plains areas present on the leading hemisphere. This is the opposite of what some scientists expected; Shoemaker and Wolfe proposed a cratering model for a tidally locked satellite with the highest cratering rates on the leading hemisphere and the lowest on the trailing hemisphere. This suggests that during the period of heavy bombardment, Dione was tidally locked to Saturn in the opposite orientation. Because Dione is relatively small, an impact causing a 35 kilometer crater could have spun the satellite. The pattern of cratering since then and the bright albedo of the leading side suggests that Dione has remained in its current orientation for several billion years.

Like Callisto, Dione's craters lack the high-relief features seen on the Moon and Mercury; this is probably due to slumping of the weak icy crust over geologic time.

 Atmosphere 

On April 7, 2010, instruments on board the unmanned Cassini probe, which flew by Dione, detected a thin layer of molecular oxygen ions around Dione, so thin that scientists prefer to call it an exosphere rather than a tenuous atmosphere. The density of molecular oxygen ions determined from the Cassini plasma spectrometer data ranges from 0.01 to 0.09 per cm3.

The Cassini probe instruments were unable to directly detect water from the exosphere due to high background levels, but it seems that highly charged particles from the planet's powerful radiation belts could split the water in the ice into hydrogen and oxygen.

 Exploration 
Dione was first imaged by the Voyager space probes. It has also been probed five times from close distances by the Cassini orbiter. Space.com Calla Cofield. August 17, 2015.

In May 2013, it was announced that NASA's spacecraft Cassini had provided scientists with evidence that Dione is more active than previously realized. Using topographic data, NASA teams deduced that crustal depression associated with a prominent mountain ridge on the leading hemisphere is best explained if there was a global subsurface liquid ocean like that of Enceladus.  The ridge Janiculum Dorsa has a height of 1 to 2 km (0.6 to 1.2 miles); Dione's crust seems to pucker 0.5 km (0.3 miles) under it, suggesting that the icy crust was warm when the ridge formed, probably due to the presence of a subsurface liquid ocean, which increases tidal flexing.

 Gallery 

 See also 
 Dione in fiction
 Former classification of planets
 Helene – moon at Dione's leading Lagrangian point, 
 Polydeuces – moon at Dione's trailing Lagrangian point, 

 References 

 External links 

Dione Profile at NASA's Solar System Exploration site
The Planetary Society: Dione
Cassini images of Dione 
Images of Dione at JPL's Planetary Photojournal
3D shape model of Dione (requires WebGL)
Dione global  and polar  basemaps (December 2011) from Cassini'' images
Dione atlas (Sept. 2011) from Cassini images 
Dione nomenclature and Dione map with feature names from the USGS planetary nomenclature page
Google Dione 3D, interactive map of the moon

 
16840321
Discoveries by Giovanni Domenico Cassini
Moons with a prograde orbit